The Spain national football team has played in several matches dating back to 1913, which according to various sources are not counted as 'Tier A' international matches. In 2020, the sports newspaper Marca reported that there were 74 such matches, most of them either played during the Spanish Civil War era (late 1930s), charity fundraisers or pre-tournament warm-up matches against clubs or regional representative teams; of the 403 players involved in those matches, 89 were never capped in an official match.

1913

1924

1926

1927
 In May 1927, Spain played a friendly against Portugal in Madrid on the same day as they played Italy in Rome. The squad for the Italy game was more experienced and considered to be stronger, while several players in the Portugal match made their debuts; consequently the side that played Portugal is considered to have been equivalent to a Spain B team (although they won their match while the 'A team' lost theirs) and thus not a full international, although the match is included in some media articles relating to the Portugal–Spain football rivalry and in some statistical tallies of caps for the players involved (this is not included in Marca's 74 matches).

1933

1934

1936

Civil War period
Following the outbreak of the Spanish Civil War in 1936, no official matches were played by Spain until 1941. The vast majority of the squad in 1936 either originated from the Basque provinces, or played for FC Barcelona in Catalonia, both of which were initially within Republican territory in the conflict. The Basque players formed their own quasi-national team and left Spain to play a long series of exhibition matches on tour around Eastern Europe and Latin America to provide funds and exposure for local causes, and Barcelona did likewise; most of the players in both groups never returned. Back in Spain, as the Nationalist side took control of more of the country, General Franco saw the opportunity to use football as a positive propaganda tool, and arranged for a match to be played in his home region of Galicia against Portugal, whose leader Salazar was supportive of Francoist Spain. Recognition was granted by FIFA at short notice and the match took place in Vigo in November 1937. In contrast to Portugal's settled squad, the Spain pool was hastily assembled from the best available players in Nationalist areas, and Portugal won for their first victory over their neighbours. A return match was arranged for the following January in Lisbon, also won by Portugal, and which attracted attention when three local players refused to give the Roman salute before kick-off; they were initially imprisoned, but were soon released due to the political influence held by the hierarchy of the club they played for, Belenenses. The matches are not considered official, but are included in some media articles relating to the rivalry and in some statistical tallies of caps for the players involved.
 In February 1938, the Spain squad played further unofficial matches in North Africa (Ceuta, Tétouan and Melilla) against a team representing Spanish Morocco, to raise funds for the many local troops involved in the war.

1937

1938

1940

1941

1947

1950
In the run-up to the 1950 FIFA World Cup, Spain played two unofficial friendly matches against Mexico, minus the players taking part in the 1950 Copa del Generalísimo Final (including Athletic Bilbao's prolific goalscorer Zarra). Many of the locals were hostile to the Spanish political regime and the second match ended in controversy when the final whistle was blown as a shot which would have won the match for Spain was on its way to goal; Spanish supporters threw objects at the Mexican players as they left the field. The fallout was a major contributory factor in  Asturias and Real Club España, two of the most successful teams in Mexican football and both with strong links to Spain, withdrawing from the professional ranks. A few weeks later, the touring Hungária team (made up of players who had defected from the communist regimes in Hungary and Czechoslovakia, led by Ladislao Kubala) played twice in Madrid against an approximation of the Spain World Cup squad, with the right-wing Franco government happy to co-operate with those fleeing from left-wing ideologies for political reasons.

1951

1953

1955

1960

1962

1964

1965

1966

1967

1970

1977

1985

1988

1990

2003
 After the cancellation of the friendly against Mexico in New Jersey, a new match was organized by Iñaki Sáez.

2013
 A friendly match between Equatorial Guinea and Spain in November 2013 was declared void by FIFA a month later due to a procedural error in confirming the use of a local referee. However, the RFEF includes the match and player statistics in its records, and these are usually counted in other sources (e.g. Juanfran Torres scored his only international goal in the fixture). Therefore, this match is included in the 2010–19 results and overall head-to-head record lists.

 20th November 2013, FIFA declares South Africa-Spain match (19 November 2013) invalid for the purposes of ranking due to the Spanish team making one more change than allowed. However, some days before FIFA confirms South Africa's friendly win over Spain FIFA have taken into account that both teams had agreed on the conditions of the match and submitted the necessary documentation prior to the match in order for FIFA to confirm it as an ‘A’ international.

2022
 The match between Jordan and Spain on 17 November did not count as an official friendly. The reason for that was because the Spanish FA and FIFA had agreed to increase the number of substitutions each team could make so that Spain's players was fresh for the start of the FIFA World Cup 2022 (whose opening occurred on November 20th).

Notes

References

Unofficial
Lists of national association football team unofficial results